Gozal Ainitdinova (born 22 August 1998) is a Kazakhstani tennis player.

Ainitdinova has a career-high WTA singles ranking of 396, achieved on 23 April 2018. She also has a career-high WTA doubles ranking of 379, which she reached on 31 October 2022. She has won two singles titles and five doubles titles on the ITF Circuit.

In 2018, Ainitdinova was nominated for the Kazakhstan Fed Cup team for the first time.

ITF Circuit finals

Singles: 8 (2 titles, 6 runner-ups)

Doubles: 9 (5 titles, 4 runner-ups)

Notes

External links
 
 
 

1998 births
Living people
Kazakhstani female tennis players
Tennis players at the 2018 Asian Games
Medalists at the 2018 Asian Games
Asian Games medalists in tennis
Asian Games bronze medalists for Kazakhstan
21st-century Kazakhstani women